Luca Maurice Mack (born 25 May 2000) is a German professional footballer who plays as a midfielder for Hungarian club Újpest.

Personal
Besides football, Luca Mack enjoys watching basketball as he is friends with Lukas Herzog.

References

External links
 

2000 births
Living people
German footballers
Association football midfielders
VfB Stuttgart II players
VfB Stuttgart players
Újpest FC players
Bundesliga players
2. Bundesliga players
Regionalliga players
People from Bietigheim-Bissingen
Sportspeople from Stuttgart (region)
Footballers from Baden-Württemberg